Popovich (Bulgarian: Попович) is a village in eastern Bulgaria. It is located in the municipality of Byala, Varna Province.

As of September 2015 the village has a population of 647.

References
 http://www.grao.bg/tna/tab02.txt

Villages in Varna Province